Cabascabo is a 1968 Nigerien-French drama film directed by Oumarou Ganda. It was entered into the 6th Moscow International Film Festival, where it won a Diploma.

Cast
 Oumarou Ganda as Cabascabo
 Zalika Souley as Hawa

References

External links
 

1968 films
1968 drama films
Nigerien drama films
French black-and-white films
Nigerien black-and-white films
Zarma-language films
French drama films
1960s French films